Cirsium undulatum is a species of thistle known by the common names wavyleaf thistle and gray thistle. It is native to much of central and western North America from British Columbia east to Manitoba and south as far as the State of Durango in Mexico. It has also been found outside of its native range as an introduced species.

Cirsium undulatum is widespread and found in many habitat types. It is a perennial herb exceeding  in height. The stem branches a few times toward the top of the plant if at all. The leaves are very wavy along the edges and usually cut into shallow toothed lobes. The head is lined with spiny phyllaries of different shapes. The fruit is an achene a few millimeters long with a pappus which may be up to 4 centimeters in length.

Cirsium undulatum has been shown to have its seed production reduced by an exotic weevil Larinus planus which was released to control Canada thistle.

References

External links
Jepson Manual Treatment
Calphotos Photo gallery, University of California

undulatum
Flora of North America
Plants described in 1818